The Shantinath Jain temple is located in Kothara of Kutch district, Gujarat, India. The temple is dedicated to Shantinatha and is an important place of pilgrimage for the followers of Jainism.

History
The temple was built on the 13th day of Magha, the eleventh month in Hindu calendar, in V.S. 1918. The constructed by Shah Velji Malu, Shah Keshavji Nayak, Shivji Nensi, and Osval Vanias of Kothara at £40,000. The architecture of the temple is inspired from the Jain temple in Ahmedabad. The temple was constructed by Mistris of Kutch under the supervision of Salat Nathu of Sabhrai. The Shantinath statue was installed by Acharya Ratnasagarsuri of Achal Gaccha. In the famous poem 'Keshavji Nayak' this temple was compared to Meruprabha temple of Palitana temples, giving the temple name 'Kalyan Tunk'.

Architecture

The temple is surrounded by a high fort with five cells and  gate. Through a very rich two-storied entrance gate, an outer yard surrounded by buildings set apart for the use of priests opens into a walled quadrangle with a shrine in each wall. In the centre of the quadrangle, on a 6 feet 9 inches plinth reached by fifteen steps, is the temple, 78 feet long 69 wide and 73 high, supported on three sides by rich two-storied domed porches. The domed hall, mandap rises in two stories, and over the shrine is a spire with richly carved figure niches and mouldings.

Inside, the hall, mandap, surrounded by aisles or verandahs, with a richly designed pavement of different coloured marbles, has 22 pilasters, and 16 pillars, and a dome supported on eight pillars with foiled arches and struts. Inside of a wall, chiefly formed of 20 pillars richly carved with flowers, leaves and creepers is the shrine where supported on either side by seven small figures, is a large image of Shantinath in padmasana posture with a golden crown sitting on a richly carved marble throne. The upper story of the hall, reached by stone steps from the south-west porches, has a corridor with rich shrines each containing a large marble sitting image. Moolnayak of this temple is a 90  cm high, white-coloured idol of Shantinatha in Padmasana posture. Below the hall there is an underground shrine, with about twenty-five large white marble figures with precious stones let into the eyes, chests, and arms. Besides the underground shrine, there is a bhonyra especially prepared against a time of trouble.

Gallery

See also

Jainism in Gujarat

References 

Jain architecture
Jain temples in Gujarat
19th-century Jain temples
Māru-Gurjara architecture